The European Union (Accessions) Act 2003 (c 35) is an Act of the Parliament of the United Kingdom which ratified and legislated for the accession of the Czech Republic, Estonia, Cyprus, Latvia, Lithuania, Hungary, Malta, Poland, Slovenia and Slovakia to the European Union from 1 May 2004. It received royal assent on 13 November 2003.

See also
Treaty of Accession 2003
List of Acts of the Parliament of the United Kingdom relating to the European Communities / European Union

External links
The European Union (Accessions) Act 2003, as amended from the National Archives.
The European Union (Accessions) Act 2003, as originally enacted from the National Archives.
Explanatory notes to the European Union (Accessions) Act 2003.

United Kingdom Acts of Parliament 2003
Acts of the Parliament of the United Kingdom relating to the European Union
2003 in the European Union